Triumphalisnema is a genus of nematodes belonging to the family Traklosiidae.

Species:

Triumphalisnema acaudata 
Triumphalisnema bialulaundatum 
Triumphalisnema lenkoi

References

Nematodes